Dennis Peters may refer to:

 Dennis Alaba Peters (died 1996), Gambian actor
 Dennis G. Peters (born 1937), analytical chemist